Deaths and Entrances is the second studio album by Scottish indie rock band My Latest Novel, released on 18 May 2009 on Bella Union. The album is named after a Dylan Thomas poem of the same name. Regarding the album's title, the band state:

Background
According to the band:

Track listing
"All In All In All Is All"
"Dragonhide"
"Lacklustre"
"I Declare a Ceasefire"
"A Dear Green Place"
"Argument Against the Man"
"Man Against the Argument"
"If the Accident Will"
"Hopelessly Endlessly"
"Re-Appropriation of the Meme"
"The Greatest Shakedown"

Personnel
Andy Miller - producer, engineer
Kenny McLeod - mastering
Michelle Blade - cover artwork
Paul McGeachy - inner artwork, layout
Gary Deveny - inner artwork, layout
Ryan King - inner artwork, layout

References

2009 albums
My Latest Novel albums
Bella Union albums